Edward Goodrich Acheson (March 9, 1856 – July 6, 1931) was an American chemist. Born in Washington, Pennsylvania, he was the inventor of the Acheson process, which is still used to make Silicon carbide (carborundum) and later a manufacturer of carborundum and graphite.

Biography

 

Acheson (1856–1931) was raised in the coal fields of southwestern Pennsylvania.
Acheson attended the Bellefonte Academy for three years, 1870–72; this being the totality of his formal education.
 He left school at the age of 16 to help support his family after his father died, and worked as a surveying assistant for the Pittsburgh Southern Railroad.

He devoted his evenings to scientific pursuits—primarily electrical experiments. In 1880 he had the temerity to attempt to sell a battery of his own invention to Thomas Edison and wound up being hired. Edison put him to work on September 12, 1880 at his Menlo Park, New Jersey laboratory under John Kruesi. Acheson experimented on making a conducting carbon that Edison could use in his electric light bulbs.

In 1881 he was sent to the International Exposition of Electricity in Paris, as part of the team led by Charles Batchelor, and he remained in Europe in 1882 to install demonstrations of the Edison system of electrical lighting in Antwerp City Hall in Belgium and in La Scala in Milan, among other public places.

In 1884, Acheson left Edison and became supervisor at a plant competing to manufacture electric lamps. He began working on the development of methods to produce artificial diamond in an electric furnace. After heating a mixture of clay and coke in an iron bowl with a carbon arc light he found shiny, hexagonal crystals (silicon carbide) attached to the carbon electrode. He called it carborundum.

In 1891 Acheson built an electricity plant in Port Huron at the suggestion of Edison and used the electricity to experiment with carborundum.
 
On February 28, 1893, he received a patent on this highly effective abrasive although a 1900 decision gave "priority broadly" to the Electric Smelting and Aluminum Company "for reducing ores and other substances by the incandescent method".
 
Acheson received 70 patents relating to abrasives, graphite products, reduction of oxides, and refractories. He was awarded the first Acheson Award, named in his honour, by the Electrochemical Society in 1931. 

He died on July 6, 1931, in New York City.

Recognition
In 1953, the Pennsylvania Historical and Museum Commission installed a historical marker outside his home, noting the historic importance of his achievements.  In 1997, Acheson was inducted into the National Inventors Hall of Fame.  His house, the Edward G. Acheson House in Monongahela, Pennsylvania is a National Historic Landmark.

As one of The Electrochemical Society's most prestigious members, the organization presents an award in his name every two years to distinguish contributions to the advancement of any of the objects, purposes, or activities of the Society.

Notes

Further reading

1856 births
1931 deaths
People from Washington, Pennsylvania
19th-century American inventors
20th-century American inventors
American chemists
Edison Pioneers
Presidents of the Electrochemical Society
Inventors from Pennsylvania